Albert Naumann (19 May 1875 – 14 July 1952) was a German fencer. He competed at the 1908 and 1912 Summer Olympics.

References

External links
 

1875 births
1952 deaths
People from Plauen
People from the Kingdom of Saxony
German male fencers
Olympic fencers of Germany
Fencers at the 1908 Summer Olympics
Fencers at the 1912 Summer Olympics
Sportspeople from Saxony
20th-century German people